Nathan Landman (born November 19, 1998) is an American football linebacker for the Atlanta Falcons of the National Football League (NFL). He played college football at Colorado.

Early life 
Landman was born on November 19, 1998 in Harare, Zimbabwe where his father, Shaun, was playing international rugby. When his family returned to the United States they settled in Danville, California.

High school athlete 
He attended Monte Vista High School and played baseball, rugby and football. Landman played wide receiver as well as linebacker earning accolades in both positions. Over his four varsity years Landman amassed over 1,000 yards receiving and made over 160 tackles, 15 sacks and 4 interceptions. In his senior year Landman led Monte Vista in a state playoff run. In his final season Landman was the East Bay Athletic League MVP. He was awarded All-NorCal High School Football Team by MaxPreps and East Bay Defensive Player of the Year by the San Jose Times. He was named to all district and state teams for his final two seasons.

Landman was ranked as the 5th best linebacker and 57th best player in California by ESPN. Scout had Landman as high as 2nd and 33rd.

Landman had offers from multiple major Division I programs, including Arizona, Boise State, Colorado State, Hawaii, Nevada, Oregon State, Washington State and Wyoming. Landman committed to Colorado on July 20, 2016.

College athlete 
Landman was given significant playing time as a true freshman, playing mostly special-teams but also on defense. In his college debut vs Texas State Landman recorded one tackle for a loss. Later that year against the Utah Utes Landman had six tackles as well as a forced fumble in a starting role. Landman came into the 2018 Colorado football season as a starter and in the first game of 2018 he made a career high 16 tackles, and had an interception against him by the rival Colorado State Rams. Landman continued with a 13 tackle game along with another interception vs the Nebraska Cornhuskers on national television. In his first two games Landman amassed 29 tackles and two interceptions.

Landman finished the season with 104 total tackles, 64 of which were solo, 4 sacks and two interceptions. In early 2019 Landman received an All-Pac-12 Conference from the coaches and media.

Professional career
Landman signed with the Atlanta Falcons as an undrafted free agent on May 2, 2022. He made the Falcons' initial 53 man roster out of training camp. He was released on December 10, 2022 and re-signed to the practice squad. He signed a reserve/future contract on January 9, 2023.

Personal life 
Landman has two siblings: a brother, Brenden, who plays college football; and a sister, Ocean Trail, who swims collegiately.

References

External links
 Atlanta Falcons bio
 Colorado Buffaloes bio

1998 births
Living people
People from Danville, California
People from Harare
Players of American football from California
Sportspeople from the San Francisco Bay Area
Zimbabwean players of American football
American football linebackers
Colorado Buffaloes football players
Atlanta Falcons players